Cynder may refer to:

Cynder, a band in Battle for Ozzfest
Cynder, a main character in The Legend of Spyro

See also 
Cinder (disambiguation)